Charing Cross Hospital Medical School (CXHMS) is the oldest of the constituent medical schools of Imperial College School of Medicine.

Charing Cross remains a hospital on the forefront of medicine; in recent times pioneering the clinical use of CT scanning, reflective of its position as one of the most important neuroscience centres in London; and advances in oncology and chemotherapy. Students of the medical school have benefited from this expertise, with many taking a research interest in these areas during their training.

History

It was founded in 1818, as part of the Charing Cross Hospital, by Dr Benjamin Golding, to meet the needs of the poor who flocked to the cities in search of work in the new factories. This was a revolutionary notion at a time when London doctors mainly practised privately. The hospital was well patronised, and soon had to move to larger premises in Agar Street (near Villiers Street, off the Strand), where it first became known as Charing Cross in 1834.

Buildings on this site were expanded several times, but by the late 1950s it became clear that no further expansion would be possible in the area, and the hospital would have to move. Two sites were identified – a rebuild of the Fulham Hospital in west London, and a new-build site at Northwick Park in Harrow, north London. Whilst many staff supported the idea of moving to the northern suburbs, the Fulham site was selected and building began in the late 1960s. Northwick Park Hospital was built as well, but to a reduced budget.

The new hospital opened in 1973, still known as Charing Cross Hospital. To avoid confusion, for the first ten years, correspondence was referred to "Charing Cross Hospital at Fulham".

From the opening of the new hospital in 1973, the medical school was contained entirely within the hospital tower (in the east wing laboratory block), but in 1976 the medical school's own building (the Reynolds Building) was completed. Housing the CXHMS students’ union (now part of Imperial College School of Medicine Students' Union, it saw the start of many ongoing traditions, including the annual "Invasion of London", in which garishly-dressed students persuade commuters and other city folk to donate to charity. A large brass Maltese cross was brought from the old (Strand) site to the bar to serve as the students' emblem, and newly qualified doctors traditionally "Sign the Cross" on graduation.

Merger
In 1984, CXHMS merged with local rivals Westminster Hospital Medical School to form Charing Cross and Westminster Medical School (CXWMS). This merger took place against the background of a series of mergers between London medical schools in the early 1980s, which foreshadowed the second, larger round of mergers in the late 1990s. During this round, CXWMS merged with Imperial College, London (whose medical department was at St Mary's Hospital Medical School), the National Heart and Lung Institute at the Royal Brompton Hospital, and the Royal Postgraduate Medical School to form Imperial College School of Medicine.

Alumni
 Carys Bannister
 Patrick Dixon
 Joseph Fayrer
 Constance Fozzard
 Robert Heptinstall, chair of the Pathology department, Johns Hopkins Hospital
 Rosalind Hurley
 Thomas Henry Huxley
 Sir Bruce Keogh, Medical Director of the NHS
 Louise Lake-Tack, Governor-General of Antigua and Barbuda, 2007-
 David Livingstone
 Cecil Lyster
 Christine Moffatt
 William Kitchen Parker
 Ann Redgrave, wife of Steve Redgrave
 Edith Summerskill
 Jane Yardley, author
 Khushwant Lal Wig

List of deans

See also 
 Imperial College Healthcare NHS Trust

References

External links
 Website
 Lists of Charing Cross Hospital Medical School students

Video clips
 Second Health London on YouTube

Medical schools in London
History of Imperial College London
Educational institutions established in 1818
United Hospitals
1818 establishments in England
Imperial College School of Medicine